This is a list of members of the fourth Western Cape Provincial Parliament, as elected in the election of 22 April 2009 and taking into account changes in membership since the election.

See also
 List of members of the 3rd Western Cape Provincial Parliament
 List of members of the 5th Western Cape Provincial Parliament

References
  

List of Members